Slovakia participated in the Eurovision Song Contest 2010 with the song "Horehronie" written by Kamil Peteraj and Martin Kavulič. The song was performed by Kristina. The Slovak entry for the 2010 contest in Oslo, Norway was selected through the national final Eurosong 2010, organised by the Slovak broadcaster Slovenská televízia (STV). 60 entries competed in the national final which consisted of nine shows: six quarter-finals, two semi-finals and a final. In the quarter-finals, four entries were selected by a public vote to advance from each show. Twenty-four entries qualified to compete in the semi-finals where six entries were selected to advance from each show based on the combination of votes from a three-member jury panel and a public vote. Twelve entries ultimately qualified to compete in the final on 27 February 2010 where "Horehronie" performed by Kristina was selected as the winner after scoring the most points from the jury and public vote.

Slovakia was drawn to compete in the first semi-final of the Eurovision Song Contest which took place on 25 May 2010. Performing during the show in position 4, "Horehronie" was not announced among the top 10 entries of the second semi-final and therefore did not qualify to compete in the final. It was later revealed that Slovakia placed sixteenth out of the 17 participating countries in the semi-final with 24 points.

Background 

The nation's best placing in the contest was eighteenth, which it achieved in 1996 with the song "Kým nás máš" performed by Marcel Palonder. Following the introduction of semi-finals in 2004, Slovakia had yet to feature in a final. Slovakia achieved their least successful result in 2009, where they returned to the contest and failed to qualify to the final with the song "Leť tmou" performed by Kamil Mikulčík and Nela Pocisková.

The Slovak national broadcaster, Slovenská televízia (STV), broadcasts the event within Slovakia and organises the selection process for the nation's entry. STV had used both national finals and internal selections to select their Eurovision entries. STV confirmed their intentions to participate at the 2010 Eurovision Song Contest on 28 March 2009. In 2009, the broadcaster selected the Slovak entry via a national final, a procedure that was continued for their 2010 participation.

Before Eurovision

Eurosong 2010 

Eurosong 2010 was the national final format developed by STV in order to select Slovakia's entry for the Eurovision Song Contest 2010. The competition consisted of nine shows which commenced on 22 January 2010 and concluded with a final on 27 February 2010. The nine shows took place at the STV studios in Bratislava and hosted by Martin Rausch with Martin Kontúr hosting segments from the green room. All shows in the competition were broadcast on Jednotka as well as online at the broadcaster's official website stv.sk. The final was also broadcast online at the official Eurovision Song Contest website eurovision.tv.

Format 
The format of the competition consisted of nine shows: six quarter-finals on 22 January 2010, 24 January 2010, 29 January 2010, 31 January 2010, 5 February 2010 and 7 February 2010, two semi-finals on 14 and 21 February 2010, and a final on 27 February 2010. The quarter-finals each featured ten competing entries from which a public vote exclusively determined the top four entries to qualify to the semi-finals. The two semi-finals each featured twelve entries from which the 50/50 combination of votes from a public vote and a jury panel determined the top six entries to qualify to the final. Both the public and the jury assigned scores ranging from 1 (lowest) to 12 (highest) and the six entries that had the highest number of points following the combination of these scores advanced to the final. The final featured the remaining twelve entries and the winner was determined by the 50/50 combination of votes from a public vote and a jury panel. Both the public and the jury assigned scores ranging from 1 to 12 and the entry that had the highest number of points following the combination of these scores was declared the winner. Viewers were able to vote via SMS and the proceeds from the public voting were donated towards those affected by the 2010 Haiti earthquake. In the event of a tie during the semi-finals and final, the tie was decided in favour of the entry that received the highest score from the public vote.

The three-member jury panel that participated in the semi-finals and final consisted of:

 Ľubica Čekovská – Composer
 Janko Lehotský – Singer
 Martin Sarvaš – Lyricist, manager of the band Tublatanka which represented Slovakia in the Eurovision Song Contest 1994

Competing entries 
Artists and composers were able to submit their entries between 14 July 2009 and 30 October 2009. Artists were required to hold Slovak citizenship. Songwriters were able to submit more than one song, however each artist could only perform one song in the competition. Songs were required to be performed in Slovak with an exception being made for the chorus which could be in English. The broadcaster received 239 submissions at the closing of the deadline and an expert committee selected sixty entries for the competition. The competing entries were announced on 15 December 2009 and among the artists was Marcel Palonder who represented Slovakia in the Eurovision Song Contest 1996. On 26 January 2010, "Chýrna zem" performed by Gionno and Ján Mitaľ and "Sevilla" performed by Golden Storm were withdrawn from the competition and replaced with the songs "Príčina" performed by Guru Brothers and "Dolina, dolina" performed by Lekra.

Quarter-finals 
Six quarter-finals took place on 22, 24, 29 and 31 January and 5 and 7 February 2010. In each quarter-final ten acts competed and the top four entries as determined by a public vote advanced to the semi-finals.

Following the first quarter-final, on 28 January 2010, "Taká sa mi páči" performed by Hrdza was disqualified from the competition due to the song having been performed before 1 October 2009. Following the fourth quarter-final, on 1 February 2010, "Čelný náraz" performed by Barbora Šulíková was disqualified from the competition due to the song having been performed in 2009.

Semi-finals 
Two semi-finals took place on 14 and 21 February 2010. In each semi-final twelve acts competed and the top six entries as determined by the combination of votes from a public vote and a jury panel advanced to the final.

Final 
The final was originally scheduled to take place on 28 February 2010, however it was rescheduled to 27 February 2010 instead following the recent success of the Slovak men's ice hockey team at the 2010 Winter Olympics. The twelve entries that qualified from the semi-finals competed and the combination of votes from a public vote and a jury panel selected "Horehronie" performed by Kristina as the winner. In addition to the performances of the competing entries, guest performers included Maltese singer Claudia Faniello performing "Samsara", and 2001 and 2006 Maltese Eurovision entrant Fabrizio Faniello performing "No I Can Do". Kristina and Mista were tied at 23 points each but since Kristina received the most votes from the public she was declared the winner.

At Eurovision 

According to Eurovision rules, all nations with the exceptions of the host country and the "Big Four" (France, Germany, Spain and the United Kingdom) are required to qualify from one of two semi-finals in order to compete for the final; the top ten countries from each semi-final progress to the final. The European Broadcasting Union (EBU) split up the competing countries into six different pots based on voting patterns from previous contests, with countries with favourable voting histories put into the same pot. On 7 February 2010, a special allocation draw was held which placed each country into one of the two semi-finals. Slovakia was placed into the first semi-final, to be held on 25 May 2010.

The running order for the semi-finals was decided through another draw on 23 March 2010 and Slovakia was set to perform in position 4, following the entry from Estonia and before the entry from Finland. Despite being one of the pre-contest favourites, at the end of the first semi-final, Slovakia was not announced among the top 10 entries in the first semi-final and therefore failed to qualify to compete in the final. It was later revealed that Slovakia placed sixteenth in the semi-final, receiving a total of 24 points. Slovakia was placed fourteenth by the public with 34 points and sixteenth by the juries with 25 points.

The two semi-finals and the final were broadcast in Slovakia on Dvojka with commentary by Roman Bomboš. The Slovak spokesperson, who announced the top 12-point score awarded by Slovakia during the final, was Ľubomír Bajaník.

Voting 
Voting during the three shows involved each country awarding points from 1-8, 10 and 12 as determined by a combination of 50% national jury and 50% televoting. Each nation's jury consisted of five music industry professionals who are citizens of the country they represent. This jury judged each entry based on: vocal capacity; the stage performance; the song's composition and originality; and the overall impression by the act. In addition, no member of a national jury was permitted to be related in any way to any of the competing acts in such a way that they cannot vote impartially and independently. The members that comprised the Slovak jury were: Juraj Čurný, Dezider Kukoľ, Ľubica Čekovská, Marcel Palonder and Mirka Brezovská.

Below is a breakdown of points awarded to Slovakia and awarded by Slovakia in the first semi-final and grand final of the contest. The nation awarded its 12 points to Malta in the semi-final and to Germany in the final of the contest.

Points awarded to Slovakia

Points awarded by Slovakia

References

External links 
 STV Eurosong website (in Slovak)

2010
Countries in the Eurovision Song Contest 2010
Eurovision
Eurovision